Zhang Xinxin (born October 19, 1983) is a Chinese international football player.

Club career
Originally from Beijing, he would move to Shenzhen to begin his professional football career with top-tier football club Shenzhen Ping'an at the beginning of the 2002 football league season where he initially started out as a midfielder. With them he would become a squad regular and even see them win the league title in the 2004 league season. He was however unable to establish himself within the squad and would transfer to the newly promoted Wuhan Huanghelou team at the beginning of the 2005 Chinese Super League season. At Wuhan F.C. Zhang would have greater playing time and was part of the squad that won the Chinese Super League Cup as well as finishing fifth within the league. Zhang would be a vital player as he helped guide the club to several mid-table finishes until in the 2008 Chinese Super League when the club found themselves fighting against relegation and one of their players was given an eight match ban after a scuffle, the club thought the punishment was too hard by the Chinese Football Association, which then saw the club disband in retaliation as well as being subsequently relegated from the league. This led to Zhang transferring to Beijing Guoan at the beginning of the 2009 Chinese Super League season for 1,150,000 RMB. In his first season, the club's manager Lee Jang-Soo would move him to left-back where he quickly establish himself as an integral member of the team and would aid Beijing Guoan to win the league title at the end of the season.

International career
Zhang Xinxin was given a call-up to the senior Chinese national team for the first time against Laos on July 28, 2011 in a 2014 FIFA World Cup qualification game, where China won 6–1.

Honours
Shenzhen Ping'an
Chinese Super League: 2004

Wuhan Huanghelou
Chinese Super League Cup: 2005

Beijing Guoan
Chinese Super League: 2009

References

External links
Player stats at Sohu.com
Player stats at football-lineups website
Player profile at Beijing Guoan website

1983 births
Living people
Chinese footballers
Footballers from Beijing
High School Affiliated to Renmin University of China alumni
China international footballers
Chinese Super League players
Shenzhen F.C. players
Wuhan Guanggu players
Beijing Guoan F.C. players
Association football defenders
Association football midfielders
Beijing Guoan F.C. non-playing staff